Baker Botts L.L.P. is an American law firm of around 725 lawyers. Headquartered in One Shell Plaza in Downtown Houston, Texas, the firm has energy and technology  related clients. It is referred to as the second-oldest law firm west of the Mississippi.

History
The firm was originally founded as Gray and Botts in 1865 by Peter W. Gray and Walter Browne Botts.

In 1872, James Addison Baker joined the firm, and the name was changed to Gray, Botts & Baker. Gray left the partnership in 1874 to join the Supreme Court of Texas, and the two remaining partners, Walter Browne Botts and Judge Baker, renamed the firm to Baker & Botts. Judge Baker's son, Captain Baker, joined the firm as a clerk in 1877, a lawyer in 1881, and became a partner in 1887, at which time the name became Baker, Botts and Baker.

In 1896, Captain Baker, personal attorney for Texas millionaire William Marsh Rice, drew up a new will for Rice and was the will's executor. In 1900, Rice was poisoned in his bed by his valet, Charles F. Jones, and his New York City lawyer, Albert T. Patrick. Captain Baker was a key witness and helped investigate the murder after Patrick produced a will that gave him control of five million dollars in 1904. Baker got the will as evidence in the case, and it was subsequently proved that Patrick had forged Rice's signature on the will he submitted. The case was not settled until 1910, and by that time the estate had grown to almost $10 million. When the intent of Rice's will was finally executed, it led to the establishment of the William Marsh Rice Institute for the Advancement of Literature, Art, and Science, which is now called Rice University.  

Captain Baker's son also joined the firm in 1919, and his classmate and friend, Henry Malcolm Lovett joined in 1924. Walter H. Walne served as managing partner from 1926 to 1933.

James Addison Baker, III, former Chief of Staff in President Ronald Reagan's first administration and United States Secretary of State  (a.k.a. James Baker), joined the firm as a senior partner in 1993 after leaving public service. He maintained two offices in Washington, being also affiliated as a partner at the Carlyle Group.

In 2000, the firm renamed itself Baker Botts. In 2019, John W. Martin was elected managing partner of the firm. Based in the Palo Alto office, Martin became Baker Botts’ first managing partner based outside of Texas.

Baker Botts is active in community service and pro bono efforts. The firm provided legal support for victims of Hurricane Harvey in 2017 and responded to the COVID crisis with the publication of a COVID-19 Community Resource Guide.

Dutch quality newspaper NRC investigated Baker Botts representation of Rosneft in a Dutch court case dealing with the Russian state's appropriation of Yukos. The two oil giants were embroiled in a bitter feud between Putin and an opponent of his, Khodorkovsy, the controlling shareholder of Yukos. Khodorkovsky was subsequently jailed, and Rosneft picked up the pieces of Yukos' bankruptcy. Journalist Joep Dohmen of NRC wrote that Baker Botts helped its client Rosneft forge Armenian court rulings to shore up Rosneft's claims in Dutch courts. NRC, claiming possession of the actual court papers, found that Baker Botts partner Ryan Bull and his Moscow associate Izabella Sarkisyan were co-authors of the verdict in Case 1494, which, according to NRC, was handed to Armenian judge Dremeyan on a USB drive. According to NRC, the text included the Armenian coat of arms. The NRC article has been translated into English. The article stated that Rosneft and Baker Botts denied NRC's allegations.  The article also stated that Yukos settled out of court after the Dutch court admitted the proofs of these actions.

Miller, Cassidy, Larroca & Lewin 
Miller, Cassidy, Larroca & Lewin (formerly Miller, Cassidy & Evans) was a Washington, D.C.-based boutique law firm law firm specializing in litigation, particularly criminal defense. Among its founding partners and namesakes were former United States Department of Justice officials Herbert J. "Jack" Miller, who led the Criminal Division under Attorney General Robert F. Kennedy, and John Cassidy. The firm's prominent clients included President Richard Nixon, Senator Edward M. Kennedy, White House Deputy Chief of Staff Michael Deaver, NASCAR, and the American Broadcasting Company (ABC) in its litigation with Food Lion grocery stores. The firm merged into Baker Botts in 2001.

Notable partners and employees

 Claude Allen, 1991–1995; advisor to President George W. Bush
 Judge James A. Baker, partner, father of Captain James A. Baker
 Captain James A. Baker, joined 1881, partner 1887, grandfather of James Addison Baker, III
 James A. Baker III, partner, 1993–present; grandson of Captain James A. Baker; served as White House Chief of Staff, United States Secretary of the Treasury, United States Secretary of State
 Amy Coney Barrett, United States Supreme Court Justice
 Christopher "Casey" Reid Cooper, United States district court judge
 Richard C. Breeden, former employee, activist hedge fund manager and former SEC Chairman 
 George W. Bush, former mail room employee; President of the United States, 2001-2009
 Jean Dalby Clift, former employee, 1952–1957
 Wallace Clift, former employee, 1953–1957
 Ted Cruz, former employee, 1995; United States Senator, 2013–present 
 Dillon Anderson National Security Advisor, 1955-1956
Jennifer Walker Elrod, former employee, 1994–2002; judge, United States Court of Appeals for the Fifth Circuit
 Peter W. Gray, founder, partner, 1840–1874
 Joe R. Greenhill, former employee, of counsel; Chief Justice of the Supreme Court of Texas, 1972–1982
 James Wesley Hendrix, United States district court judge
 Robert Jordan, partner; United States Ambassador to Saudi Arabia, 2002-2003
 Rebeca Huddle, former partner; Justice of the Supreme Court of Texas, 2020–present
 Matthew J. Kacsmaryk, United States district court judge
 Robert Keeton, former employee; judge and law professor
 Jerome H. Kern, former senior partner, founding partner of Wachtell, Lipton, Rosen & Katz, former CEO of Linkshare, Playboy Enterprises, and Colorado Symphony
 Stuart A. Levey, Under Secretary for Terrorism and Financial Intelligence within the United States Department of the Treasury
 Thomas R. Phillips, current partner, retired Chief Justice of the Texas Supreme Court 1988–2004
 Maureen Ohlhausen, current partner, former Commissioner of the Federal Trade Commission 2012-2018

Miller Cassidy 
Notable attorneys who worked at Miller Cassidy before its merger with Baker Botts included:

 Jamie Gorelick, Deputy Attorney General of the United States (1994–1997)
 Ketanji Brown Jackson, Associate Justice, Supreme Court of the United States (2022-present); judge, United States Court of Appeals for the D.C. Circuit
 Seth P. Waxman, Solicitor General of the United States (1997–2001)

References

External links

 
 

Law firms established in 1840
Law firms based in Houston
Foreign law firms with offices in Hong Kong
1840 establishments in the Republic of Texas